"A Bailar" is the debut single by Argentine singer Lali, serving as the lead single for her debut studio album of the same name (2014). The song was released to digital download on Lali's official website on August 5, 2013.  It was co-written and produced by Espósito, Pablo Akselrad, Luis Burgio and Gustavo Novello from the production company 3musica.

Live performances
Espósito gave her first live performance of "A Bailar" on her first show as solo artist on September 2, 2013 at La Trastienda Club, Buenos Aires. On October 11, 2013, Espósito performed the song on Disney Channel's The U-Mix Show, becoming its first televised performance. Additionally, the singer performed the song at the 2014 Emozione Festival in Caserta, Italy on March 15. Through the rest of 2014, she performed the single at the 2014 edition of Un Sol para los Chicos and at the ninth edition of Bailando por un Sueño. One year later, Espósito performed the song at the tenth edition season finale of Bailando por un Sueño Argentina. In 2016, Espósito performed the song on Laten Argentinos and at the 2016 edition of Un Sol para los Chicos. "A Bailar" was also part of the setlist of Espósito's worldwide tour, A Bailar Tour.

Music video
The video was released on Espósito's YouTube channel on September 5, 2014. The video shows the singer dancing through different scenarios. Lali can also be seen singing with an old microphone.  The video won in the category of "Best Female Video" at the 2014 Quiero Awards.

Remix
The official remix by TripleX was released on 3 December 2015 with "Amor de Verdad" as part of the deluxe edition of A Bailar.

Formats and track listings

Awards and nominations
For the 2014 Quiero Awards, the song won in the category of "Best Female Video" and received a nomination for "Best Pop Video". It also won the award for "Favorite Song" at the 2014 Kids' Choice Awards Argentina.

References

2013 songs
Lali Espósito songs
2013 singles
Songs written by Gustavo Novello
Songs written by Pablo Akselrad
Songs written by Lali Espósito